Sergei Nikolayevich Bulgakov (– 13 July 1944) was a Russian Orthodox theologian, priest, philosopher, and economist. Orthodox writer and scholar David Bentley Hart has said several times that Bulgakov was "the greatest systematic theologian of the twentieth century." Father Sergei Bulgakov also served as a spiritual father and confessor to Mother Maria Skobtsova (who was canonized a saint by the Holy Synod of the Ecumenical Patriarchate on 16 January 2004).

Biography

Early life: 1871–1898
Sergei Nikolayevich Bulgakov was born on 16 July 1871 to the family of an Orthodox priest (Nikolai Bulgakov) in the town of Livny, Oryol Governorate, in Russia. The family produced Orthodox priests for six generations, beginning in the sixteenth century with their ancestor Bulgak, a Tatar from whom the family name derives. Metropolitan Macarius Bulgakov (1816–1882), one of the major Eastern Orthodox theologians of his days, and one of the most important Russian church historians, was a distant relative.

At the age of fourteen, after three years at the local parish school, Bulgakov entered the seminary in Oryol. In 1888, however, Bulgakov quit the seminary after a loss of his faith. Bulgakov later notes that the passion for the priesthood waned as he grew disenchanted with Orthodoxy because his teachers were unable to answer his questions. After Bulgakov quit seminary, he entered a secular gimnasium in Elets to prepare for the law faculty of the Imperial Moscow University.

Early political thought: 1890–1897
In 1890, Bulgakov entered the Imperial Moscow University where he chose to study political economy and law. As he reflected years later, however, literature and philosophy were his natural inclination and he had no interest in law. Bulgakov only chose to study law because it seemed more likely to contribute to his country's redemption. After his graduation in 1894, he began graduate studies at the university and taught for two years at the Moscow Commercial Institute. It was during his graduate studies when Bulgakov studied with the economist Alexander Chuprov. Bulgakov's thought during his studies with Chuprov has generally been seen through the lens of the Marxist-Populist debate. From this perspective, he has been labeled a "legal Marxist."

In 1895, Bulgakov published a review of Karl Marx's unfinished third volume of Das Kapital, and authored an essay in 1896, “On the Regularity of Social Phenomena.” In the following year, Bulgakov published a study “On Markets in Capitalist Conditions of Production.” It was these writings that originally established Bulgakov as a significant representative of Marxism in Russia.

From Marxism to Idealism: 1898–1902
On January 14, 1898, shortly before embarking for Western Europe, Bulgakov married Elena Tokmakova, with whom he had two sons and a daughter.

In 1898 Bulgakov left for Western Europe to begin his research for his dissertation, Capitalism and Agriculture, that was intended to test the application of Marx’s theory of capitalist societies to agriculture. Bulgakov examined the entire agricultural history of Germany, the United States, Ireland, France, and England. The thesis ended by declaring that Marx’s analysis of capitalism, limited by features of the English economy, did not integrate this system with an economic theory of agriculture, and was not a realistic, universal account of capitalist society.

In 1900 Bulgakov presented his finished dissertation for examination. It was this examination that led Bulgakov to being a privatdozent at the University of Kiev and Professor of Political Economy at the Kiev Polytechnic Institute in 1901. It was evident in lectures such as "Ivan Karamazov as a philosophical type" delivered in Kiev that Bulgakov had already distanced himself from Marxism. At the time of Bulgakov teaching about Dostoevsky, the counterweight to Marxism in 20th century Russia was Neo-Kantianism. While Bulgakov was heavily influenced by Neo-Kantianism, it was Vladimir Soloviev, who he began to read in 1902, that influenced Bulgakov to finally reject materialism and accept idealism. Bulgakov's idealism eventually led him back to the Eastern Orthodox Church.

Turmoil: 1903–1909

Together with Petr Struve, Bulgakov published the journal Liberation and with him was a founder of the illegal political organization Union of Liberation in 1903. After the Revolution of 1905, its members formed the Constitutional Democratic (Kadet) Party, which held the most seats in the representative assemblies, the First and Second Dumas (1906–1907). Bulgakov did not join the Kadets and instead formed the Union of Christian Politics, a party advocating Christian socialism. Although he was elected to the Second Duma in 1907 as a deputy from the Oryol Governorate, Bulgakov had no party allegiance. In June 1907, the Second Duma dissolved after barely five months in session.

After the dissolution of the Second Duma, Bulgakov lost what remaining zeal he had for direct political involvement. Another major factor in his eventual separation from the Union of Liberation was the increasingly anti-Christian direction being championed by leading representatives of left-liberal politics.

Earlier, in 1905 Bulgakov, along with the Brotherhood of Christian Struggle, bishops, priests, and many others, supported the call for a council of the Orthodox Church in support of social reforms. In 1906, a preconciliar commission prepared six volumes of information for the council. Nicholas II thwarted the planned council, but the information would be put to use when it eventually did convene eleven years later.

Amidst the chaos of 1905, Bulgakov made the acquaintance of Pavel Florensky (1882–1937), with whom he would establish a long-lasting friendship. Bulgakov and Florensky were among founding members of the Religious-Philosophical Society in memory of Vladimir Soloviev, which was organized in Moscow at the end of 1905.

During 1904–1909, his focus shifted to an explicitly Christian perspective. Bulgakov also changed his attitude towards the controversial Nicholas II. He believed Nicholas II was responsible for the social problems plaguing Russia. Although Bulgakov did not appreciate the increasing radicalization of the leftists in Russia and their abandonment of Russian Orthodoxy in favor of a purely secular state. Quite the contrary, it caused him to uphold the positive value of governance by Nicholas II, even as he continued to detest him, accusing him of promoting the revolution and bringing about the demise of the royal family. Bulgakov continued to struggle with the meaning of political power as he wrote Unfading Light.

In the summer of 1909,  Bulgakov's four-year-old son Ivashechka, died. At the funeral Bulgakov had a profound religious experience that is generally regarded as his final step in his journey back to Orthodoxy. Bulgakov would later contemplate the meaning of death in his later works, including Unfading Light.

Civic life: 1918–1944

In 1918, Bulgakov was ordained to the priesthood, and rose to prominence in church circles. He took part in the All-Russia Sobor of the Russian Orthodox Church that elected patriarch Tikhon of Moscow. Bulgakov rejected the October revolution and responded with On the Feast of the Gods ("На пиру богов", 1918), a book similar to the Three Talks of Vladimir Solovyov.

In 1918, Bulgakov moved to join his family in the Crimea, where for two years he taught political economy and theology at the university in Simferopol. When the Bolsheviks captured Simferopol in 1920 they removed him from his teaching position.

In 1922 the Soviet government exiled around 150 prominent intellectuals on the so-called Philosophers' ship, Bulgakov, Nikolai Berdyaev, and Ivan Ilyin among them.

In 1925 he helped found St. Sergius Orthodox Theological Institute (l'Institut de Théologie Orthodoxe Saint-Serge) in Paris, France. While living in Paris, he completed two dogmatic trilogies on Sophiology — the first, The Burning Bush (1926), The Friend of the Bridegroom (1927), Jacob’s Ladder (1929); the second, The Lamb of God, The Comforter, The Bride of the Lamb (1939). It is in The Bride of the Lamb that Bulgakov argues for apokatastasis. Bulgakov states that humankind will "ultimately be justified." He also argues in this book for a supramundane fall, saying that "empirical history begins precisely with the fall, which is its starting premise."

After the publication of his book, Lamb of God, Bulgakov was accused of teachings contrary to Orthodox dogma by the Metropolitan Sergius I of Moscow, in 1935, and recommended his exclusion from the Church until he amended his "dangerous" views. The Karlovtsy Synod (i.e., Russian Orthodox Church Outside Russia) also joined in this condemnation. Metropolitan Evlogy set up a committee in Paris to investigate Bulgakov’s orthodoxy, which reached a preliminary conclusion that his thought was free from heresy. However, an official conclusion was never reached.

He was the head of this institute and Professor of Dogmatic Theology until his death from throat cancer on 12 July 1944. His last work was devoted to the Apocalypse. He was buried in Sainte-Geneviève-des-Bois Russian Cemetery in the southern suburbs of Paris.

Bibliography 
 
 
 
 
 
 
 
 
 
 
 
 
 
 Bulgakov, Sergei (1899). A Contribution to the Question of the Capitalist Evolution of Agriculture. Published in nos. 1–3 of the magazine Nachalo in January–March 1899.
 Bulgakov, Sergei (1969). Father Sergius Bulgakov, 1871–1944: a collection of articles. London: Fellowship of St Alban and St Sergius, [1969]
 
 Bulgakov, S. N. (1995). Apocatastasis and transfiguration : comprising his essay "On the question of the apocatastasis of the Fallen Spirits" (B. Jakim, Trans.). New Haven: Variable Press.
 James Z. Pain, Nicolas (Ed.) (1976), Sergius Bulgakov. A Bulgakov Anthology. London.
 Rowan Williams (Ed.) (1999), Sergii Bulgakov. Towards a Russian Political Theology. Edinburgh: T&T Clark Ltd.

See also

References

Further reading
 R. Williams, Sergii Bulgakov: Towards a Russian Political Theology (1999) Continuum.
 N. Zernov, The Russian Religious Renaissance of the Twentieth Century (1963)
 L. Zander, God and the world (2 vols. 1948) [Russian text] (a survey of Bulgakov's thought)
 
 Paul Valliere, "Modern Russian Theology: Bukharev, Soloviev, Bulgakov : Orthodox theology in a new key." (2000) Edinburgh: T&T Clark.
 Robert F. Slesinksi, "The Theology of Sergius Bulgakov" (2017) New York: St Vladimir's Seminary Press
 Brandon Gallaher, "Freedom and Necessity in Modern Trinitarian Theology" Oxford 2016: Oxford University Press [on Sergii Bulgakov, Karl Barth, and Hans Urs von Balthasar]
 Walter N. Sisto, "The Mother of God in the Theology of Sergius Bulgakov. The Soul of the World." (2017) London: Routledge.
 Mikhail Sergeev, "Sophiology in Russian Orthodoxy: Solov'ev, Bulgakov, Losskii, and Berdiaev." (2006) Lewiston N.Y.: Edwin Mellen Press.
 Catherine Evtuhov, "The cross and the sickle. Sergei Bulgakov and the fate of Russian religious philosophy." (1997) Ithaca etc.: Cornell University Press.
 Sergij Bulgakov, "Bibliographie. Werke, Briefwechsel und Übersetzungen" (B. Hallensleben & R. Zwahlen Eds.  Vol. 3). (2017) Münster: Aschendorff Verlag. (Bibliography with Russian titles and German translation.)

External links
 
 
 Sergei Bulgakov (in Russian)
 «Unfading Light» (in Russian)
 Sergius Bulgakov Society – Extensive collection of links to Bulgakov resources
 – Sergij Bulgakov Research Center; List of English translations including pdf-downloads
 Forschungsstelle Sergij Bulgakov (dt.)
 Bulgakoviana: The website of researchers and admirers of Father Sergius Bulgakov

1871 births
1944 deaths
People from Livny
People from Livensky Uyezd (Oryol Governorate)
Russian people of Tatar descent
Russian Christian socialists
Members of the 2nd State Duma of the Russian Empire
Philosophers from the Russian Empire
Theologians from the Russian Empire
Eastern Orthodox theologians
Systematic theologians
Eastern Orthodox mystics
Sophiology
Soviet expellees
Liberals from the Russian Empire
Vekhovtsy
Eastern Orthodox socialists
Christian socialist theologians
Christian universalist theologians
Russian Christian mystics
20th-century Eastern Orthodox theologians
20th-century Christian mystics
19th-century Eastern Orthodox theologians
19th-century Christian mystics
Imperial Moscow University alumni
Soviet emigrants to France
Deaths from cancer in France
Burials at Sainte-Geneviève-des-Bois Russian Cemetery